Brushy Creek (also called Brushy Fork) is a stream in Franklin County in the U.S. state of Missouri. It is a tributary of Saint Johns Creek.
 
Brushy Creek was so named on account of brush along its course.

See also
List of rivers of Missouri

References

Rivers of Franklin County, Missouri
Rivers of Missouri